Satyrium spini, the blue spot hairstreak, is a butterfly in the family Lycaenidae.

Subspecies
Subspecies include:
 Satyrium spini spini – (Southern and Central Europe)
 Satyrium spini melantho (Klug, 1834) – (Caucasus, Armenia, Talysh Mountains, Kopet-Dagh)

Distribution
The blue spot hairstreak lives in southern and middle Europe (Portugal, Spain, France, Italy, Switzerland, Austria, Germany, Poland, Hungary, Croatia, Greece, Turkey) up to approximately 54° N. It is also found in Asia Minor, Lebanon, Iraq, Iran, South Urals. It is not found in the northwest of France, the Netherlands, Scandinavia, Estonia or Latvia. It is also not found in large parts of Italy and on most Mediterranean islands. It inhabits open shrubby places, grassy areas, mountain meadows and woodland clearings, from low levels to about 2000 m.

Description

Satyrium spini has frontwings reaching  in males,  in females. The basic color of the upperside of the wings is brownish, while the underside is yellowish-beige. In the females the upperside of the hindwings usually shows brownish-orange spots on the edge. The underside of the hindwings has a large blue spot and a few orange black bordered spots. The underside of forewings and hindwinhs is crossed by a bright white transverse line. Hind wings have short tails.

Biology
It is a univoltine species. Adults fly from  late May to early August, depending on location. Caterpillars feed on Rhamnus, Prunus, Frangula alnus, Frangula daurica, Sorbus and Malus.

References

External links
 Paolo Mazzei, Daniel Morel, Raniero Panfili Moths and Butterflies of Europe and North Africa
 Lepiforum
 Schmetterling-raupe.de
 Lepidoptera Caucasi

Satyrium (butterfly)
Butterflies of Europe
Butterflies described in 1775
Taxa named by Ignaz Schiffermüller